Alpari Group is a foreign exchange, precious metals, and contract for difference (CFD) broker that has a record of insolvency and regulatory difficulties. The company's UK entity entered insolvency on January 19, 2015, following heavy losses trading the Swiss franc against the euro. In April 2015, the company's US NFA membership was revoked, preventing them from offering their services in the United States.

The company is licensed to trade in:
Belarus
Saint Vincent and the Grenadines

The company's charter is registered in Saint Vincent and the Grenadines. Alpari Research & Analysis Limited, which gives a London address, provides only research and analysis and is not licensed to trade.

Andrey Valerievich Dashin owns both Alpari and another foreign exchange broker FXTM, also known as ForexTime.

History
The company was established in Kazan, Russia, in 1998. However, it wasn't until 2002 that Alpari began expanding internationally by making its website available in English.

United Kingdom
Alpari (UK) was founded in 2004. It was regulated by the Financial Services Authority in September 2006. The company opened and closed several branches in other countries. Alpari UK Ltd was fined £140,000 for anti-money laundering failings by the FSA in 2010. The firm's former money laundering reporting officer, Sudipto Chattopadhyay, was also fined £14,000. Cyprus office opened in 2010 and the CySEC license was acquired that year and renounced in December 2012. That office closed in February 2013. Alpari (UK) entered Indian market in 2008 and left India in March 2014.  For UK residents, the company also offered financial spread betting on Forex and indices.

On January 16, 2015, Alpari has entered insolvency following heavy losses the previous day when the Swiss National Bank removed the franc's ceiling against the euro. On January 19, Alpari (UK) Ltd. applied for formal insolvency and the English High Court appointed a special administrators from KPMG under Special Administration Regime.

Russia
Alpari-Broker Ltd. was established as legal entity in September 2008 in Kazan, Russia. It was licensed as a professional participant of the equity markets for providing brokerage, dealership and money managing services by the Central Bank of Russia. 

Additionally, it was an associated member of NAFD (National Association of Forex Dealers), a self-regulatory organization created by Forex brokers. Since March 2017, Alpari is a member of AFD (Association of Forex Dealers) — the only SRO accredited by the Russian central bank.

On December 27, 2017, the Central Bank of Russia revoked Alpari's license (along with the license of four other FX brokers), effectively ordering it to stop its Russian operation by January 27, 2018.

United States
Alpari US LLC was established in 2006. It had its NFA membership approved in November 2007 and removed in April 2015.

The Alpari Charitable Fund
The Alpari Charitable Fund was founded in 2005 by Andrey Dashin with the goal of helping children from the Republic of Tatarstan to reach their full potential regardless of their socio-economic background or mental and physical disabilities.

In 2018, the Alpari Charitable Fund provided a total of 29.4 million rubles in of support to residents of Tatarstan.
In the first half of 2019, a total of 24.9 million rubles was provided in support to beneficiaries in Tatarstan.

India 
In September 2022, the Reserve Bank of India (RBI), India's central bank, released a list of 34 forex trading online platforms, in which Alpari was also listed as illegal in India.

References

Financial services companies established in 1998
Foreign exchange companies
Financial derivative trading companies
Online brokerages
Defunct financial services companies